Bracha “Beatie” Deutsch (ברכה דויטש; née Rabin; born August 29, 1989) is a Haredi American-Israeli marathon runner. She has won the Tiberias Marathon and the Jerusalem Marathon, as well as the Israeli half-marathon and marathon national championships.

Background 
Deutsch was born in the United States, the oldest of five siblings, grew up in Passaic, New Jersey, and emigrated to Israel in 2008. Her father is a doctor. She has a master's degree in school counseling from Northeastern University ('12), as well as a black belt in taekwondo.

A Haredi woman, Deutsch lives in Har Nof, Jerusalem, with her husband Michael, a yeshiva teacher and computer science student whom she married in 2009, and their five children. Before she put all her time into running, Deutsch worked full-time as a communication officer for an Olami international Jewish organization, which brings college students closer to religion and helps professionals get in touch with their roots by coming to Israel.

Running career

2016–2017 

Deutsch began running in 2016 at the age of 25. She runs in a long-sleeved top, below-the-knee skirt, and head scarf, and dedicates her runs to charitable causes.

She ran her first marathon at the Tel Aviv Marathon in 2016 after taking up running only four months earlier. Deutsch finished sixth, with a time of 3:27:26.

At the 2017 Tel Aviv Marathon, while seven months pregnant, Deutsch finished with a time of 4:08:16.

2018 
In March 2018, Deutsch was the first placed Israeli in the Jerusalem Marathon and the sixth place overall, with a time of 3:09:50, setting a course record for Israeli female runners. Later that year she won the Israel Half Marathon Championship in Beit She'an, with a time of 1:19:53 hours.

2019 
At the Israeli National Championships Marathon in Tiberias, Deutsch won first place with a time of 2:42:18, the fifth-best result of all time for female Israeli runners.

In May, Deutsch ran her first international race, winning the Riga half marathon, in 1 hour 17 minutes and 34 seconds. In September of that year, Deutsch ran in the Sanlam Cape Town Marathon and finished in the 8th place.

Deutsch trained for the 2020 Olympics. She qualified for the Olympics, ranking as one of the top 80 women runners in the world. However, when the Tokyo Olympics was postponed due to COVID-19, the women's marathon moved from a Sunday to a Saturday. She tried to appeal the decision that moved that race to Shabbat, so she could compete without transgressing her religious beliefs. However, the IOC declined her request. And, in April 2020, runners had to requalify for an Olympic spot; while Deutsch ran a personal record of 2:31:39 in England, she did not make the cutoff.

2020 
In the Tiberias Marathon held in January 2020, Deutsch won a gold medal and finished in fourth place overall and first place for women with a new personal best of 2:32:25. In the Miami Half-marathon, she won a gold medal with a time of 1:16:49.

2021 
At the Cheshire Elite Marathon in the United Kingdom, Deutsch improved her personal marathon record to 2:31:39 and arriving in the 5th place. This year, at the Israeli Athletics Championships, Deutsch participated in the 800 meters race and came in third place, achieving a personal record of 02:10.80.

2022 
Deutsch won the women's category of the Tiberias Marathon for the fourth consecutive time in December 2022 with a time of 2:41:20.

Image
In June 2021, Deutsch was included by the sports clothing manufacturer Adidas along with the Russian figure skater Alexandra Trusova, the Indian short distance runner Hima Das, the South African rugby player Siya Kolisi and the NBA star Damian Lillard, in a campaign entitled "Impossible is Nothing."

References

External links
Instagram page
beatiedeutsch.com

1989 births
Living people
American female marathon runners
Israeli female marathon runners
American female long-distance runners
Israeli female long-distance runners
Sportspeople from Passaic, New Jersey
Northeastern University alumni
Sportspeople from Jerusalem
Jewish female athletes (track and field)
Jewish Israeli sportspeople
Jewish American sportspeople
American emigrants to Israel
American Orthodox Jews
Israeli Orthodox Jews
American people of Israeli descent
21st-century American Jews
21st-century American women